The 1940–41 Slovenská liga (English:Slovak league) was the third season of the Slovenská liga, the first tier of league football in the Slovak Republic, formerly part of Czechoslovakia until the German occupation of the country in March 1939.

In the Slovak Republic an independent Slovak league had been established in 1939 and played out its own championship which was won by ŠK Bratislava in 1940–41. In the German-annexed Protectorate of Bohemia and Moravia a separate league, the  Národní liga (English:National league), was played and won by Slavia Prague in the 1940–41 season. A national Czechoslovak championship was not played between 1939 and 1945.

Table

References

External links
Czechoslovakia - List of final tables (RSSSF)

Czechoslovak First League seasons
1
Slovakia